United Nations Security Council Resolution 40, adopted on February 28, 1948, requested that the Committee of Good Offices watch the political developments in western Java and Madura and to report their findings to the Council frequently.

The resolution was adopted by eight votes to none, with three abstentions from Argentina, Ukrainian SSR and the Soviet Union.

See also
Indonesian War of Independence
List of United Nations Security Council Resolutions 1 to 100 (1946–1953)

References
Text of the Resolution at undocs.org

External links
 

 0040
Indonesian National Revolution
 0040
 0040
1948 in Indonesia
February 1948 events